Kathy Leander (born 24 May 1963) is a singer from the Canton of Jura, Switzerland.

She represented her country at the 1996 Eurovision Song Contest in Oslo, singing the ballad "Mon cœur l'aime", placing 16th.

After Leander, now calling herself Catherine Leander, came third in the talent show Merci, on vous écrira organised by Swiss TV station SSR, her first solo album, Je m'ennuie de vous, was released in May 2007.

References

Living people
Eurovision Song Contest entrants of 1996
French-language singers of Switzerland
Eurovision Song Contest entrants for Switzerland
Swiss Roman Catholics
People from Porrentruy District
20th-century Swiss women singers
1963 births